William N. Drohan (1946 – ) was an American microbiologist and academic known for his research in the field of hematology.

Education 
Drohan earned a Bachelor of Arts degree in bacteriology from the University of California, Los Angeles and a PhD in medical microbiology and immunology from UCLA School of Medicine.

Career 
He was known for his commitment to improving blood safety, his work in transgenic proteins to treat hemophilia and other blood-related disorders, as well as contributions in investigating mad cow disease in the blood supply.

His career included positions with the National Cancer Institute, the American Red Cross, and private companies that treated blood-borne disorders, most recently as chief scientific officer at Inspiration Biopharmaceuticals, and previously president and subsequently chief scientific officer of Clearant.

He also served as a professor in the Graduate Program of the Department of Genetics at George Washington University and formerly as an adjunct professor in the Department of Chemical and Biochemical Engineering at the University of Maryland.

He served on the editorial boards of several scientific journals, and was a member of the Scientific Steering Committee for Blood Products at Walter Reed Army Institute of Research and chairman for the Panel on Biotechnology of the National Research Council.

Death 
Drohan died of lung cancer at his home in Germantown, Maryland after a four-year illness. Drohan had previously lived in Springfield, Virginia and Santa Monica, California.

References

1946 births
2007 deaths
20th-century American educators
American microbiologists
George Washington University faculty
University of California, Los Angeles alumni
People from Germantown, Maryland
People from Springfield, Virginia
People from Santa Monica, California
Deaths from lung cancer
Deaths from cancer in Maryland
American immunologists
David Geffen School of Medicine at UCLA alumni
Scientists from Virginia